Carne pizzaiola or carne alla pizzaiola (roughly translated as "meat in pizza style"), sometimes referred to just as pizzaiola, is a dish derived from the Neapolitan and Apulian tradition that features meat (often less expensive cuts of beef) cooked with tomatoes, olive oil, garlic, and white wine  long enough to tenderize the meat. Most versions also include tomato paste, oregano and basil.

History 
The history of the pizzaiola is somewhat uncertain, even if the origin is almost certainly Neapolitan. The recipe has known a wide diffusion and has been the subject of numerous reinterpretations. The success of this particular preparation must be identified not only in the simplicity of execution, but also in the fact that once finished, it can be used as a sauce for pasta.

See also
 Neapolitan ragù
 Italian cuisine

References

External links
 Memorie di Angelina Carne alla pizzaiola

Mediterranean cuisine
Meat dishes
Neapolitan cuisine
Italian-American cuisine
Beef dishes
Tomato dishes
Foods with alcoholic drinks